Founded in 1885 by Sumner F. Dudley, Camp Dudley is the oldest continually running boys camp in the United States. It is located in Westport, New York, on the shores of Lake Champlain.   In 1993, it was included within the Camp Dudley Road Historic District when listed on the listed on the National Register of Historic Places.

History and traditions

Early history 

Sumner Dudley, long active in both the New York and New Jersey YMCA movements, was asked in 1884 to take "young honor YMCA members" camping. In 1885, he took seven boys for a week's encampment at Orange Lake, N. J. The next year Dudley moved the site to Twin Islands, Lake Wawayanda, N.J. Ultimately, the camp settled on Lake Champlain, N.Y., in 1891 . Dudley referred to the first camp as Camp Baldhead , and later the Boys' Camping Society (B.C.S.). After Dudley's death in 1897, the camp was renamed Camp Dudley.

In 2015, Camp Dudley officially parted ways with the YMCA after respectful discussions concerning Camp Dudley's desire to become independent.

Camp numbers 
Campers are assigned camp numbers in ascending order based on when they first attended Camp. The first camp number (No. 1) was assigned George Peck in 1903. Since then, over 25,000 campers, leaders, and staff have each been given a unique, identifying number. At alumni gatherings, there is often a competition to see who in attendance has the lowest and therefore oldest camp number.

Mission and values 

No longer officially operated by the YMCA, Camp Dudley is an independent camp managed by the Board of Managers. It draws from the YMCA's own tenets of mind, body, and spirit. Though non-denominational, the camp espouses "Christian values" in its teachings and programs, not least of which is its motto, "The Other Fellow First". The mission is to develop moral, personal, physical and leadership skills in the spirit of fellowship and fun, enabling boys and girls to lead lives characterized by devotion to others.

Thanks to a strong and financially supportive alumni base, the camp offers scholarships to those in financial need.

In the summer of 2006, Camp Dudley acquired a sister camp in Colchester, Vermont called Camp Dudley at Kiniya, after purchasing the former Camp Kiniya from the Williams family. A driving force in this expansion was for the daughters of Camp Dudley alumni to have a place to learn the same ethics and values that their sons could learn at Camp Dudley.

Alumni

One of the unique characteristics of Dudley is the loyalty and support of its alumni. For most campers, their relationship with Dudley does not end with the close of the camping season but continues throughout their lives. Many former campers return as Leaders, and alumni and parents contribute to Dudley through their financial support. All friends of Dudley are invited to attend the alumni gatherings, as well as the August CDA Reunion at Camp.  Between 35 and 40 alumni gatherings are held during the year throughout the country and around the world on the Dudley "Reunion Trail". 2009 was Camp Dudley's 125th summer.

Camp Dudley at Kiniya
In 2006 Camp Dudley officially acquired Camp Kiniya to expand its rich camping tradition to girls. Camp Kiniya was founded in 1919 by Helen Van Buren and lies on the Vermont shores of Lake Champlain, in Colchester. Traditions at Camp Kiniya include the Kiwi Day, where the entire camp celebrates campers and staffers who have attended for four years or more. Camp Dudley at Kiniya has grown into a balanced blend of both camps, including traditions from each original camp. There are 16 camper cabins, with additional staff cabins. The camp is divided into two divisions, Junior Division and Senior Division. Summer 2018 was the camp's 100th summer.

Campers, Leadership, Leaders, and Staff 
At both Dudley and Kiniya, there are cabins that support a variety of ages. At Dudley, campers are typically 10-14, and at Kiniya campers are 10-14. Girls and boys are placed in cabins based on their ages. The cabins are divided into divisions: Cubs, Plebes, Juniors, and Seniors for Dudley and Cubs, Cats, Juniors and Seniors for Kiniya. Kiniya is, in general, a smaller camp, with fewer campers and less acreage. When you finish your last camper year, you may apply to become an Aide, the first step on the road in being a leader. An Aide lives in cabins with young campers but still has the opportunity to play on sports teams with the oldest campers. At 16 and 17, you can become a Junior Leader or Assistant Leader, paid positions in cabins that are designed to support the leader. At 18, one may become a leader, the main counselor in the cabin. One can also be a program staff member at 18 and beyond, working in the Athletics, Arts, Outdoors, or Waterfront departments.

Daily Activities/Program Areas

Athletics 
There are many athletic opportunities for boys and girls to participate in. There is:
 Basketball
 Soccer
 Softball/Baseball
 Tennis
 Golf
 Ultimate Frisbee
 Handball
 Lacrosse
 Archery
These are played in a major, a specialized activity block for each child, or team competition, a time of the day where teams play sports against each other to learn the value of respect and good sportsmanship.

Arts 
 Theatre 
 Arts and Crafts
 Theatre Tech
 Music
 Ceramics

Outdoors 
 Hiking and Overnight Camping
 Challenge Course Elements (low and high)
 Rock Climbing
 Camp craft

Waterfront 
 Kayaking 
 Canoeing
 Sailing
 Paddle boarding
 Swimming
 Boating
 Windsurfing
 Diving

Spiritual 
There is a very profound spiritual life at Kiniya and Dudley, especially on Sundays. There is a chapel service on Sunday mornings with a guest speaker. Their purpose is to inspire the children with encouraging words for the following week. It is meant to help campers more fully understand "The Other Fellow First", and provides an atmosphere of togetherness and unity. The speakers provide many valuable life lessons in their speeches. All campers and staff members wear the camps' traditional blue and white colors to this service. On Sunday nights, the camps individually gather to sing Hymns. This is one of the most valued traditions of both Dudley and Kiniya.

Other Activities 
Every Wednesday and Saturday shows are performed by the campers and staff. Wednesday nights are talent shows, and Saturday nights are scripted plays. Each division has its own extravaganza once a session, which is a themed day planned by the division's leaders.

Dudley Cheers 
Dudley:

“D-U-D-L-E-Y / Whitewashed cookies, chicken pie / Pink music, pickeral fry / Westport, Westport my oh my / All ye campers stand in line (line)/ Take your hats off just like mine (mine) / Bevo, bivo, boom get a rat trap bigger than a cat trap, bevo, bivo, BOOM!

Notable alumni 
R. Inslee Clark, Jr. (1935–1999) First Dean of Admissions at Yale University to admit women 
Tate Forcier Former University of Michigan quarterback and Canadian Football League player
Bruce Gehrke professional football and basketball player (NY Giants, NY Knicks)
Oliver Jeffers Artist
Burgess Meredith (1907–1997) Actor, film & television
Shaun O'Hara Center, New York Giants
Clark Peterson - Horticulturalist
Bob Pettit NBA Basketball Player, 1970 Basketball Hall of Fame inductee
Andrew Weibrecht World Cup alpine ski racer and two-time Olympic medalist
James Widdoes Actor, director, film and television
Cameron Winklevoss
Tyler Winklevoss
Samuel Adams Wisner Rapper
Quenton Nelson All Pro NFL Guard (Indianapolis Colts)

See also
Summer camp
YMCA
Lake Champlain

References

External links
 
 
 

Dudley
1885 establishments in New York (state)
Tourist attractions in Essex County, New York
Buildings and structures in Essex County, New York
Dudley
Temporary populated places on the National Register of Historic Places